The 45th Antalya Golden Orange Film Festival was held from October 10 to 19 2008 in Antalya, Turkey. Awards were presented in the 45th Antalya Golden Orange Festival in 20 categories of three competition divisions and in the 4th Eurasia Film Festival in 4 categories. The award ceremony took place on October 19, 2008 at the Konyaaltı Amphitheatre in the downtown of Antalya. It was run in conjunction with the 4th International Eurasia Film Festival.

Jury
Following cinema professionals formed the juries:

Antalya Golden Orange Film Festival

Feature film competition
 Tuncel Kurtiz, actor (chairman)
 Ali Akdeniz, producer
 Serdar Akar, director 
 Ayda Aksel, actress
 Fadik Sevin Atasoy, actress
 Ömer Faruk Sorak, director
 Sevin Okyay, playwright
 Çetin Tunca, camera director
 Güven Kıraç, actor

Documentary film competition
 Güneş Karabuda, director (chairman)
 Demet Evgar, actress
 Oğuz Makal, lecturer
 Hasan Özgen, director
 Tayfun Talipoğlu, journalist/writer

Short subject competition
 Selim Demirdelen, director (chairman)
 Zafer Algöz, actor
 Ulaş İnaç, director
 Leyla Özalp, producer
 Özge Özberk, actress

Nominees

Antalya Golden Orange Film Festival

Following 15 national films (in alphabetical order) were nominated to compete for the Golden Orange Award:
 Başka Semtin Çocukları directed by Aydın Bulut
 Bunu Gerçekten Yapmalı mıyım? by İsmail Necmi
 Dilber'in Sekiz Günü by Cemal Şan
 Gitmek by Hüseyin Karabey
 Gökten Üç Elma Düştü by Raşit Çelikezer
 Gölge by Mehmet Güreli
 Hayat Var by Reha Erdem
 İki Çizgi by Selim Evci
 Nokta by Derviş Zaim
 Pandora'nın Kutusu by Yeşim Ustaoğlu
 Pazar: Bir Ticaret Masalı by Ben Hopkins
 Son Cellat by Şahin Gök
 Süt by Semih Kaplanoğlu
 Ulak by Çağan Irmak
 Üç Maymun by Nuri Bilge Ceylan
 Vicdan by Erden Kıral

Awards

Antalya Golden Orange Film Festival

Feature film competition

Jury special awards

Documentary film competition

Short subject competition

External links
 TURSAK

References

Golden orange
Golden Orange
Antalya Golden Orange Film Festival
A
21st century in Antalya